The Depths is a Canadian short drama film, directed by Ariane Louis-Seize and released in 2019. The film stars Geneviève Boivin-Roussy as Justine, a young woman grieving her mother's recent death at the mother's lakefront cabin, who decides to go diving in the lake after finding a scuba suit among her mother's possessions.

The film premiered at the 2019 Toronto International Film Festival. It was subsequently screened at the Cinéfest Sudbury International Film Festival, where it won the Audience Choice Award for Best Short Film.

References

External links
 

2019 films
Films directed by Ariane Louis-Seize
Films shot in Quebec
Films set in Quebec
French-language Canadian films
Canadian drama short films
2010s Canadian films